Serge Avédikian (born 1 December 1955), sometimes credited as Serje Avétikian, is an Armenian-French film and theatre actor, director, writer and producer, winner of Cannes Festival prize.

Early life
Avédikian was born in Yerevan, Armenian SSR. His parents were born in France, children of survivors of the Armenian genocide. In 1947, influenced by Joseph Stalin's and Maurice Thorez's propaganda, they left to rejoin the motherland, where Avédikian attended the French school of Yerevan. At the age of fifteen along with his family, he returned to France. He had his stage debut in college, in his professor's amateur theater company.

Professional practice
After studies at the Conservatory of Dramatic Arts in Meudon (France), he arrived in Paris in 1971 where he worked with the students of the Paris Conservatory. In 1976, he created a theater company and produced several plays. At the same time, he pursued a career as a theater, movie and television actor. In 1988, he founded his own production company but continues to direct films.

Filmography
 "Anatolian History" (2020)
 Don't Tell Me the Boy Was Mad (2015)
 Paradjanov (2013, director) as Sergei Parajanov
 The Army of Crime (2009) as Micha Aznavourian
 Bonded Parallels (2007) as Arakel
 Le Voyage en Arménie (Armenia) (2006) as Vanig
 Angkor : la forêt de pierre (2002) as voice-over narrator
  (2002) as voice-over narrator
 Aram (2002) as Talaat
 Mayrig (1991) as Vasken Papasian
 Dawn (1985)
 Dangerous Moves (1984)
 Toutes griffes dehors (1982)
 Nous étions un seul homme (We Were One Man) (1979) as Guy Rouveron
 Le Pull-over rouge (1979) as Christian Ranucci

References

External links
 Official website (French)
 

Living people
1955 births
Male actors from Yerevan
Film people from Yerevan
French male stage actors
Soviet emigrants to France
Ethnic Armenian male actors
21st-century Armenian screenwriters
French people of Armenian descent
French male film actors
French film directors
20th-century French male actors
21st-century French male actors
French male screenwriters
French screenwriters
French film producers